The Esiliiga B is the third division in the Estonian football league system. The Esiliiga B is ranked below the Esiliiga and above the II liiga. As in most countries with low temperatures in winter time, the season starts in March and ends in November.

Competition format
The league consists of 10 clubs, all teams play each other four times. Both the winning team and the runners-up are promoted to the Esiliiga directly, whereas the third place club will participate in a two-legged play-off with the 8th place club of the Esiliiga for the spot in next year's competition. Same way the 2 bottom placed teams are relegated to the II liiga. The third bottom team can avoid relegation by winning a two-leg play-off against the II Liiga play-off round winners.

Clubs

Current clubs
The following clubs are competing in the Esiliiga B during the 2023 season.

a – never been relegated from Esiliiga B
b – never played in Esiliiga
c – reserve teams are ineligible for promotion.

Champions

All-time Esiliiga B table
The table is a cumulative record of all match results, points and goals of every team that has played in the Esiliiga B since its inception in 2013. The table that follows is accurate as of the end of the 2022 season. Teams in bold play in the Esiliiga B 2022 season. Numbers in bold are the record (highest) numbers in each column.

In this ranking 3 points are awarded for a win, 1 for a draw, and 0 for a loss. Promotion matches and relegation matches involving clubs of higher or lower leagues are not counted.

The table is sorted by all-time points.

League or status at 2022:

Notes

See also
Meistriliiga
Esiliiga
Estonian Cup

References

External links
Esiliiga B 

 
2013 establishments in Estonia
3
Estonian Football Championship
Third level football leagues in Europe
Sports leagues established in 2013